Aira Azman (born 29 September 2004 in Kedah) is a Malaysian professional squash player. As of July 2022, she was ranked number 102 in the world.

References

2004 births
Living people
Malaysian female squash players